Regulator of G-protein signaling 8 is a protein that in humans is encoded by the RGS8 gene.

This gene is a member of the regulator of G protein signaling (RGS) family and encodes a protein with a single RGS domain. Regulator of G protein signaling (RGS) proteins are regulatory and structural components of G protein-coupled receptor complexes. They accelerate transit through the cycle of GTP binding and hydrolysis to GDP, thereby terminating signal transduction, but paradoxically, also accelerate receptor-stimulated activation.

References

Further reading